The 2010–11 season of the División de Plata was the 18th season of second-tier futsal in Spain.

Regular season

Standings 

Azulejos y Pavimentos Brihuega, Lanzarote Tias Yaiza & Arcebansa Zamora renounced for the next season (2011–12).

Promotion playoffs

1st round

1st leg

2nd leg

3rd leg

Second round

1st leg

2nd leg

Top goal scorers

External links
2010–11 season at lnfs.es

See also
2010–11 División de Honor de Futsal
2010–11 Copa del Rey de Futsal
División de Plata

2010 11
2010–11 in Spanish futsal
futsal